Mavis Hee (born Xu MeiJing, 27 September 1974) is a Singaporean singer, songwriter and actress. She was the second runner-up and also Miss Photogenic and Miss Amity for Singapore's Miss Chinatown Pageant 1992.

Career
Hee's first album Knowingly was released in August 1994. After the release, Taiwanese singer-composer Jonathan Lee invited her to join his production company. However, Hee rejected the offer so that she could continue working with her mentor, Chen Jiaming.

Hee went on to release other chart-topping albums. Her debut album in Taiwan, Regret, propelled her to regional stardom. She was labelled "Heavenly Queen Killer" for having beaten Faye Wong and the 'Four Heavenly Kings of Cantopop' in sales charts. The album sold 600,000 copies in Taiwan alone. Her next album, Living By Night, chalked an impressive 550,000 copies in Taiwan. Both albums sold more than 2,000,000 copies in Asia with Regret selling close to 2,500,000 copies.

Following the success, Hee broke into the competitive Cantonese market with the release of Listen Quietly. The album topped the Hong Kong International Federation of Phonographic Industry sales chart for 3 consecutive weeks, beating Hong Kong singers Andy Lau, Leon Lai and Sammi Cheng. She became the first Singaporean to win the Most Popular Female Singer award in HK Metro Hit awards, beating Faye Wong.

She also released a compilation album, Beginning To Listen: Review 1996-1999, which sold close to 500,000 copies in Taiwan. Its success is attributed to the only new song "The Cigarette You Smoke" in the album as it is made popular by being featured in a Taiwanese TV series.

Her last studio album to date is the electronic infused Static Electricity (静电) in 2000. She remains best known for her ballads, some of which have become classic songs, such as "Regret", "Iron Window", "Living By Night", "Sunshine After the Rain" and "Moonlight in the City".

In 1998, Hee was handpicked by the cinematographer Christopher Doyle to star in his directorial debut film Away With Words.

Hee faded out from the entertainment scene after 2001, when her record company, What's Music, was absorbed into Universal Music Taiwan, and the company could not accommodate her artistic integrity within commercial considerations. Hee was also appointed a cultural ambassador for China in 2001. She also recorded the hit single "Watch TV" with fellow Singaporean singers Tanya Chua and Stefanie Sun and was a guest presenter at the Star Awards 2002 as well as Star Awards 2006.

Her major public performances after 2006 include CCTV's annual mega Mid-Autumn Show 2008 which raised Hee's profile briefly throughout China and Asia, as well as being a special guest during Nanyang Technological University EMBA's 10th Anniversary Celebrations and Stefanie Sun's concert in 2014.

In 2015, Singapore's Mediacorp released a drama serial titled Crescendo that is loosely based on Hee's singing career.

In 2021, Hee released a re-recording of "Moonlight in the City" in partnership with Disney+, to promote the expanded library of Asian content on the platform. The release was accompanied by a music video featuring Hee performing the song with people of various ages. In an email interview with 8 Days, she also expressed her plans to release new music soon and tour China in the next year.

Personal life

Health issues 
From 2003 to 2004, Mavis Hee was known as having travelled around Italy. In June 2006, Hee was arrested after harassing two hotel guests at the Ritz-Carlton Hotel. She was initially warded at Singapore's Institute of Mental Health and diagnosed with clinical depression after a short stay of four weeks. She thanked her fans for their immense support in late 2006. 

Hee received the NHG Exemplary Patient Award from IMH on 27 October 2014 where she discussed her experience with clinical depression openly and has strongly advocated for mental wellness, encouraging people to seek treatment early.

Social causes
Hee became the ambassador of Singapore's National Kidney Foundation in 1999 and also a volunteer in Youth Challenge in the same year. She was the singer for Singapore's National Day Parade 2000 theme song, "Shine on Me", together with fellow Singaporean Jai.

Hee appeared as a special guest on 13 February 2007 at a Charity Concert for Silver Ribbon (Singapore) and sang "Moonlight in the City". On 27 September 2007, Hee's 33rd birthday, she released two new singles after a hiatus of seven years. They were the theme songs of the movie, Anna & Anna, "Remain Behind" (留下) and "Unknown Location" (不知处). In June 2008, Hee performed the opening act for a charity concert with other Singaporean singers to raise funds to help the victims of the 2008 Sichuan earthquake, she sang "Moonlight in the City" and "Sunshine After the Rain".

Discography
Knowingly 明知道 (1994) (Mandarin)
Regret 遗憾 (1996) (Mandarin)
Living By Night 都是夜归人 (1996) (Mandarin)
Spreading 蔓延 (1997) (Mandarin)
Listen Quietly 静听精彩13首 (1997) (Cantonese & Mandarin)
Cover Myself 好美静 (1998) (Cantonese)
Ex-Friends EP 一场朋友EP (1998) (Cantonese)
Happiness Is Not Wrong 快乐无罪 (1999) (Mandarin)
Beginning To Listen: Review 1996–1999 (Mandarin)
Static Electricity 静电 (2000) (Mandarin)

References

External links

1974 births
Living people
Singaporean people of Chinese descent
20th-century Singaporean women singers
Singaporean composers
Singaporean Mandopop singers